The Tribal Areas Rewaj Act is a bill which was introduced to the National Assembly of Pakistan and subsequently withdrawn by the government, having been met with widespread opposition. The proposed legislation called for the merger of the Federally Administered Tribal Areas (FATA) with the province of Khyber Pakhtunkhwa within five years. The act was intended to replace the Frontier Crimes Regulations (FCR) and to extend the jurisdiction of the Supreme Court of Pakistan and the Peshawar High Court over FATA.

References

Acts of the Parliament of Pakistan
2017 in Pakistani law